Jan Pronk (October 19, 1918 – March 15, 2016) was a Dutch professional cyclist who specialized in motor-paced racing. In this discipline he won five medals at the world championships, including a gold medal in 1951.

That gold medal was controversial because of the assistance by his compatriot Kees Bakker. At the end of the race, Bakker, a 35-year-old veteran at the time, was exactly one lap behind Pronk, who was in the lead. Then, up to the finish line, Bakker rode behind Pronk, covering him from attacks by the competitors. There were speculations that Bakker was paid by Pronk before the race; nevertheless, these tactics were then banned at competitions.

References

1918 births
2016 deaths
Dutch male cyclists
People from Den Helder
UCI Track Cycling World Champions (men)
Cyclists from North Holland
Dutch track cyclists
20th-century Dutch people
21st-century Dutch people